Ponteranica (Bergamasque:  or ) is a comune (municipality) in the Province of Bergamo in the Italian region of Lombardy, located about  northeast of Milan and about  northwest of Bergamo.

Ponteranica borders the following municipalities: Alzano Lombardo, Bergamo, Ranica, Sorisole, Torre Boldone, Zogno.

A part of its surface is occupied by Maresana Hill. The source of Morla is in Ponteranica. Part of Ponteranica's territory belongs of Parco dei Colli di Bergamo

Demographic evolution

References

External links
 www.comune.ponteranica.bg.it/